Květa Peschke and Katarina Srebotnik were the defending champions, but decided not to participate together.
Peschke played alongside Anna-Lena Grönefeld, but lost to Sara Errani and Roberta Vinci in the quarterfinals, while Srebotnik partnered up with Nadia Petrova.
Srebotnik successfully defended her title, defeating Errani and Vinci in the final, 6–3, 6–4.

Seeds

Draw

Draw

References
 Main Draw

W